Saint Ildefonsus of Toledo Parish Church (Spanish: Iglesia Parroquial de San Ildefonso de Toledo), commonly known as the Tanay Church, is a Roman Catholic church located in the town of Tanay, Rizal Province in the Philippines.  The construction of the present church was begun in 1773 and was completed after ten years in 1783.  In 2001, it was declared as a National Cultural Treasure Church by the National Commission for Culture and the Arts.  It is also among the seven Jubilee churches of the Diocese of Antipolo.

History 
The ecclesiastical history of Rizal province dates back to 1573 when two Franciscan missionaries, Fr. Juan de Plasencia and Fr. Diego de Oropesa began establishing missions in towns and villages along the north coast of Laguna de Bay. One of earliest established is a visita (sub-parish) is Pililla in Morong, Rizal, among them is Monte de Tan-ay (now part of the present town of Tanay). In 1583, Pillila separated from Morong and became an independent town and in turn, Monte de Tan-ay evolved into a separate town and parish on its own right in 1606. The parish church of Monte de Tan-ay was put under the patronage of Saint Ildephonsus of Toledo, Spain, hence, given the same name. In 1606, Father Pedro de Talavera founded the second mission in San Antonio in Pantay and subsequently became the first parish priest of Monte de Tan-ay. 

By 1620, the town transferred to San Antonio without changing its patron saint. The first church made up of wood and cogon grass as its roof was also established in San Antonio but was eventually burned down by the flaming arrows of marauding Aetas. Church records state that only a very old image of La Purísima Concepción was saved from the attack, believed to have been left in haste by the retreating Spanish forces.

In 1639, a wide-scale Chinese uprising took over the villages across Laguna from Manila to Bulacan. Chinese rebels descended to Tanay and established camps in Monte de Tan-ay and Pantay. A popular story recounts how a Franciscan priest, Fr. Geronimo de Frías, hid the image of La Purísima inside the jungle nearby. It was said that three Chinese soldiers unwittingly discovered the image and tried to destroy it with their spears. The spears are miraculously thrown back to the throwers. Driven by fear, the remaining Chinese who witnessed the event committed suicide by hanging himself in the tree in a place now known as Pinagbigtihan (Place of Hanging) to the present day.

The town suffered a heavy blow during the uprising which only ended when a combined Filipino-Spanish forces attacked their camps on 1640. After the rebels were oppressed, the priests transferred the parish to its present site, formally establishing the town of Tanay in the same year.

In 1678, Fr. Pedro de Espallargas initiated the building of a stone church and the first church was completed in 1680 through the contributions of churchgoers and devotees of Purísima Concepción. The first mass was celebrated on April 20, 1680. However, the structure did not last long because of natural calamities.  By 1773, the construction of the present church began through the initiative of Fr. Alonzo de Fentanes and the people of Tanay. It was gradually completed in 1783. The six retablos in honor of Our Lady of Anguish (Nuestra Señora de las Angustias), the Immaculate Conception (La Purísima Concepción), Saint Joseph, Saint Peter of Alcantara, the Baptism of Jesus Christ and Saint Ildefonsus of Toledo were installed in 1786.

The church was declared as one of the five Jubilee churches of the Roman Catholic Diocese of Antipolo near the end of 1999. In celebration of the 500th Years of Christianity, the church also declared as one of the seven jubilee churches by the year 2021.

National Cultural Treasure 
On July 31, 2001, the church was declared a National Cultural Treasure by the National Commission for Culture and the Arts along with 25 other churches in the Philippines.

Features

The style of the church, with its triangular pediment and rounded belfry, leans toward Baroque architecture. The church also houses a relic of a piece of bone of San Ildefonso housed in a monstrance, given by Rev. Fr. Felipe Pedraja in October 2006 from Zamora, Spain in which the body of the patron saint lies.

The 14 Stations of the Cross inside the church is considered one of the most beautiful Stations of the Cross in Asia.  The carvings are depicted to have Malay features as evidenced by the brown skin of the natives and their squat figures, all of which are believed to have created by native Tanay artists. Some distinct depictions are borrowed from the native culture such as the "Tambuli" made of carabao and the bolo instead of the typical Roman sword. The carvings are encased in large glass windows across each side of the church.

Gallery

References

External links

 San Ildefonso de Toledo Parish, Tanay, Rizal on Facebook

National Cultural Treasures of the Philippines
Roman Catholic churches in Rizal
1606 establishments in the Spanish Empire
Churches in the Roman Catholic Diocese of Antipolo